The year 522 BC was a year of the pre-Julian Roman calendar. In the Roman Empire, it was known as year 232  Ab urbe condita. The denomination 522 BC for this year has been used since the early medieval period, when the Anno Domini calendar era became the prevalent method in Europe for naming years.

Events

By place

Persian Empire 
 Bardiya succeeds Cambyses II as ruler of Persia.
 Babylon rebels against Persian rule.
 Darius I succeeds Bardiya as ruler of Persia. He is the son of a government official.

Births 
 Pindar, Greek poet
 Ran Qiu, leading disciple of Confucius
 Ran Yong, leading disciple of Confucius
 Shang Qu, disciple of Confucius
 Zai Yu, leading disciple of Confucius

Deaths 
 July – Cambyses II, ruler of ancient Persia
 September – Bardiya, ruler of ancient Persia
 Polycrates, tyrant of Samos
 Zichan, statesman of the State of Zheng

References 

 
520s BC